Dan Panosian (born 1969) is an American comic book artist, with extensive credits as both a penciller and an inker and has additional credits as an advertising and storyboard artist.

Early life
Dan Panosian was born in Cleveland, Ohio, to artistic parents. He is of Armenian descent.

Career

Comics
At age 14, Panosian sent an art submission to Marvel Comics, which was responded to with encouragement by the Submissions Editor, Len Kaminski. Years later he showcased his work at the New York Comic Convention, where comic book artists Neal Adams and Walt Simonson took notice. Adams offered him a position at his ad agency Continuity Graphics and Simonson called his editor, Ralph Macchio, at Marvel Comics. Panosian was soon working for both companies. Upon entering the Marvel offices for the first time, he was greeted by Kaminski, who had remembered corresponding with Panosian seven years earlier. On his office wall was a "thank you" illustration sent from the 14-year-old Dan Panosian.

After working on back-up features for Captain America, Batman, Spider-Man and Thor, Panosian's work caught the eye of the artistic teams working on the X-Men line of comic books where he became a regular inker.

When Marvel's top artistic talents left to form Image Comics, he was asked to join them and began illustrating comics that often sold around a million copies each month.

Panosian has also done work for Dark Horse Comics, Boom! Studios, and Dynamite Entertainment. He also illustrates a series of graphic novels for Le Lombard called John Tiffany.

Being a descendant of survivors from the Armenian genocide, Panosian also contributed to a graphic novel about the genocide called Operation Nemesis: A Story of Genocide & Revenge.

Advertising, film and game design
Panosian founded Dan Panosian, Inc., through which he began doing advertising work.

He was soon also working with movie and commercial studios providing design and storyboard artwork. Panosian also branched out into book and magazine illustration, apparel lines, and toy design work.

He was the lead designer on a DreamWorks video game about animals that embody the spirit of Kung-Fu. Shortly after, Dan was doing the lead design work for the video game series Duke Nukem.

Panosian illustrated one of Byron Preiss's first CD-ROM comic books, The Suit.

He made the fake comic book covers seen in the 2017 film Logan, as Marvel Comics did not allow to use actual comic book issues.

Personal life
Panosian, his wife and their son live in Los Angeles.

Awards
Panosian received an Best-of-Show Addy Award for his work on the DSL ad campaign: Jack Flash. In 2011, Panosian was the Keynote Speaker for the 2011 Inkwell Awards Awards Ceremony at HeroesCon.

Selected bibliography

Marvel Comics
 Alpha Flight
 Astonishing X-Men
 Captain America
 The Incredible Hulk
 Iron Man
 Magneto
 Marvel Tales
 Savage Sword of Conan
 Thor
 The Uncanny X-Men
 Web of Spider-Man
 Wolverine
 Wonder Man

Image Comics
 Arkham Knight
 Cyberforce
 Phantom Force
 Pitt
 Prophet
 Savage Dragon
 Slots
 Spawn
 Stormwatch
 Wetworks
 Witchblade
 Youngblood Battlezone

Other
 Operation Nemesis: A Story of Genocide & Revenge

References

External links
 

1969 births
American comics artists
American comics writers
American graphic novelists
American male novelists
American storyboard artists
American people of Armenian descent
Artists from Cleveland
Artists from Los Angeles
Marvel Comics writers
Marvel Comics people
Living people